Sterman is a surname. Notable people with the surname include:

George Sterman (born 1946), American physicist
John Sterman, American academic

See also
Sherman (name)
Stearman (disambiguation)
Stermann